California's 23rd district may refer to:

 California's 23rd congressional district
 California's 23rd State Assembly district
 California's 23rd State Senate district